Park Hyeong-hyun (Hangul: 박영현) (born October 11, 2003, in Gurye, South Jeolla) is a South Korean pitcher for the KT Wiz in the Korea Baseball Organization (KBO).

References 

KT Wiz players
KBO League pitchers
South Korean baseball players
2003 births
Living people
Sportspeople from South Jeolla Province